Thomas Wolf or Wolfe may refer to:

Wolf
 Thom Wolf (born 1944), professor at University Institute, New Delhi, India
 Thomas Wolf (criminal), German criminal and fugitive
 Thomas Wolf, CEO of German company RIB Software
 Tom Wolf (born 1948), governor of Pennsylvania
 Thomas Wolf (footballer) (born 1963), Luxembourgian football defender

Wolfe
 Thomas Wolfe (1900–1938), American novelist
 Thomas Wolfe House, his boyhood home, now a museum
 Tom Wolfe (1930–2018), American journalist and novelist
 Tom Wolfe (woodcarver), American craftsman
 Tommy Wolfe (1900–1954), Welsh footballer

See also
 Thomas Wolff (1954–2000), American mathematician
 Thomas (disambiguation)
 Wolfe (disambiguation)
 Wolf (disambiguation)